Between the Balance is the third EP released by progressive metal band Elitist.

Track listing

2013 EPs
Elitist (band) albums
Progressive metal EPs